The XXIII de Marzo Group was one of the Blackshirt units sent to Spain during the Spanish Civil War to make up the "Corpo Truppe Volontarie" (Corps of Volunteer Troops), or CTV. This unit was attached to the 2nd CCNN Division "Fiamme Nere" during the Battle of Guadalajara in March 1937. Following  defeat there, it was sent to 
Vizcaya in April 1937 with the Flechas Negras Mixed Brigade and 11 Groups of CTV Corps Artillery.

Battle of Guadalajara March 1937

Independent Group "XXIII March" - Console Enrico Francisci
 4th Grupo de Banderas - Console Francesco Gidoni
 Bandera "Toro" - 1st Seniore Mario Bertoni
 Bandera "Bisonte" - 1st Seniore Fiorentini
 Bandera "Bufalo" - 1st Seniore Piero Bologna 
 Battery (65/17)
 Engineer Section 
 5th Grupo de Banderas - Console Enrico Francisci
 540 Bandera "Lupi" - Seniore Nello Brogi
 530 Bandera "Implacabile" - Seniore Di Puccio
 Bandera "Ardente" - 1st Seniore Spangaro 
 Battery (65/17)
 Engineer Section

Vizcaya April 1937 

Agrupación XXIII de Marzo - Console Enrico Francisci
 11th Battery (65/17) 
 IV Grupo de banderas 
 Bandera "Bufalo"
 Bandera "Bisonte"  
 Bandera "Toro"  
 508 Battery (65/17) 
 Mortar Platoon 
 V Grupo de banderas 
 530 Bandera "Implacabile"
 Bandera "Ardente" 
 540 Bandera "Lupi"
 608 Battery (65/17) 
 Mortar Platoon
 Carabinieri Platoon 
 Bandera de complemento

The Blackshirt (Camicie Nere, or CCNN) Divisions contained regular soldiers and volunteer militia from the Fascist Party.

See also 
 Division XXIII di Marzo

Sources 

Military units and formations of Italy in the Spanish Civil War
Military units and formations established in 1937